Xanthoparmelia pokornyi is a lichen species in the family Parmeliaceae. It contains the depsides gyrophoric acid and stenosporic acid.

See also
List of Xanthoparmelia species

References

pokornyi
Lichen species
Lichens described in 1860
Taxa named by Gustav Wilhelm Körber